Daniel Alan Goldston (born January 4, 1954, in Oakland, California) is an American mathematician who specializes in number theory. He is currently a professor of mathematics at San Jose State University.

Early life and education
Daniel Alan Goldston was born on January 4, 1954, in Oakland, California.  In 1972, he matriculated to the University of California, Berkeley, where he earned his bachelor's degree and, in 1981, a Ph.D. in mathematics.  His doctoral advisor at Berkeley was Russell Sherman Lehman; his dissertation was entitled "Large Differences between Consecutive Prime Numbers".

Career
After earning his doctorate, Goldston worked at the University of Minnesota Duluth and then spent the next academic year (1982–83) at the Institute for Advanced Study (IAS) in Princeton. He has worked at San Jose State University since 1983, save for stints at the IAS (1990), the University of Toronto (1994), and the Mathematical Sciences Research Institute in Berkeley (1999).

Research
Goldston is best known for the following result that he, János Pintz, and Cem Yıldırım proved in 2005:

where  denotes the nth prime number.

This result was originally reported in 2003 by Goldston and Yıldırım but was later retracted. Then Pintz joined the team and they completed the proof in 2005.

In fact, if they assume the Elliott–Halberstam conjecture, then they can also show that primes within 16 of each other occur infinitely often, which is related to the twin prime conjecture.

Recognition
In 2014, Goldston won the Cole Prize, shared with Yitang Zhang and colleagues Cem Yildirim and János Pintz, for his contributions to number theory. Also, 
Goldston was named to the 2021 class of fellows of the American Mathematical Society "for contributions to analytic number theory".

See also

Landau's problems
Yitang Zhang
James Maynard (mathematician)

References

External links
Dan Goldston's Homepage

Institute for Advanced Study visiting scholars
University of California, Berkeley alumni
San Jose State University faculty
20th-century American mathematicians
21st-century American mathematicians
Number theorists
1954 births
Living people
Fellows of the American Mathematical Society